Michael Stevenson (born July 10, 1984) is a Swedish former professional cyclist.

Major results
2010
 1st  Road race, National Road Championships
 2nd Tour de la Somme
2011
 3rd Scandinavian Race Uppsala

References

External links

1984 births
Living people
Swedish male cyclists